Harry Spencer may refer to:
Harry Spencer (cricketer, born 1868) (1868–1937), English cricketer for Derbyshire
Harry Spencer (cricketer, born 1901) (1901–1954), English cricketer for Worcestershire and for Warwickshire
Harry Spencer (footballer) (1897-1942), New Zealand international football (soccer) player
Harry Spencer (rugby union) (born 1988), rugby union player

See also
Henry Spencer (disambiguation)
Harold Spencer (disambiguation)
Harrison Spencer (disambiguation)